Lancashire Hustler is the debut solo album by Keef Hartley. Robert Palmer, Elkie Brooks and Pete Gage of the band Vinegar Joe (with whom Hartley worked on the 1972 album Rock 'n Roll Gypsies) provided support on some tracks.

Track listing

1973 LP
Deram SDL 13 (UK), XDES 18070 (US)

 "Circles" (Robert Palmer) - 5:21
 "You and Me" (Hartley) - 3:57
 "Shovel a Minor" (Hartley) - 4:22
 "Australian Lady" (Hartley, John Mayall) - 4:36
 "Keef's Mom" (Hartley) - 1:01
 "Action" (John Burns) - 5:52
 "Something About You" (John Burns) - 3:58
 "Jennie's Father" (Ken Cumberbatch) - 3:12
 "Dance to the Music" (Sylvester Stewart) - 6:19

Personnel
 Jess Roden - vocals
 Junior Kerr - vocals, guitar
 Jean Roussel - keyboards
 Mick Weaver - organ, Moog
 Philip Chen - bass
 Keef Hartley - drums
 Elkie Brooks - backing vocals
 Robert Palmer - backing vocals
 Pete Gage - orchestration - tracks 3,7
 Derek Wadsworth - orchestration  - track 8
 John Burns - engineer, producer

References 

1973 debut albums
Keef Hartley Band albums
Albums produced by John Wood (record producer)
Deram Records albums